Hungry Music is a French electronic music label, created in 2013, in Aix-en-Provence, France It gathers five artists: Worakls, N’to, Joachim Pastor, Stereoclip and Joris Delacroix (last one to join - June 2019, first track in July 2019). Their musical genre is a mix of techno and acoustic music.

Story

First year 

The label was initially created by Worakls and N’to, but Joachim Pastor quickly joined the project. In 2014, Hungry Music released six first EPs, containing different tracks from the three artists. Each of them also appeared in several festivals this year, in France and abroad (Dour, Montreux Jazz Festival, Rennes’ Transmusicales, Pleinvrees, etc.).

2015 

In 2015, the label launches its first tour of France, in which the trio plays on stage individually and together, under the name of « Hungry Band ». This year, each of the artist develops his own live performance, hence projects such as « Worakls Band », « N’to Live Perc », or « Hungry Super Band », including several instrumentalists (cello, viola, violin, guitar, percussions, etc.) ; while continuing to play in various festivals. In January 2016, Hungry Music played at the nationally famous concert hall Olympia, in Paris, France.

Apart from the musical releases, Hungry Music also produces videos and shirts.

Discography 
 HM01 – Hungry (N'to - "Utopia" ; Worakls - "Porto")
 HM02 – Flocon de Neige (Worakls - "Flocon de Neige" & "Elea")
 HM03 – Petite (N'to - "Petite" & "Ayahuasca")
 HM04 – Kenia (Joachim Pastor - "Kenia" & "Couleur")
 HM05 – Salzburg (Worakls - "Salzburg" & "Far Far Away")
 HM06 – Monkey Man (N'to - "Monkey Man" & "Minor Swag")
 HM07 – Mekong (Joachim Pastor - "Mekong" & "Joda")
 HM08 – Toi (Worakls - "Toi" & "Cerisier Blanc")
 HM09 – Time (N'to - "Time" & "Chez Nous")
 HM10 – Reykjavik (Joachim Pastor - "Reykjavik" & "Oulan Bator")
 HM11 – Plein Ciel (N'to - "Plein Ciel" & "Comète")
 HM12 – Taïga (Joachim Pastor - "Taïga" & "Amazone")
 HM13 – From Now On (Worakls - "From Now On" & "Question Réponse")
 HM14 – Hungry Music Remix Vol.1 [Joachim Pastor - "Joda (Worakls-Remix)" & "Oulan Bator (Oliver Koletzki Remix)" & "Taga (N'to Remix)" ; N'to - "Chez Nous (Joachim Pastor Remix)" & "Petite (Einmusik Remix)" ; Worakls - "Toi (Boris Brejcha Remix)"]
 HM15 – Fixi (Joachim Pastor - "Fixi" & "Laos" & "The Same")
 HM16 – Mellotron (Worakls - "Mellotron" & "Pandemonium")
 HM17 – La Clé Des Champs (N'to - "La Clé Des Champs" & "In the Mood for Noune")
 HM18 – Eternity (Joachim Pastor - "Eternity" & "Millenium")
 HM19 – Airplane Lesson (Stereoclip - "Airplane Lesson")
 HM20 – Nocturne (Worakls - "Nocturne")
 HM21 – Carrousel (N'to - "Carrousel")
 HM22 – Promesse (Joachim Pastor - "Promesse")
 HM23 – Sanctis (Worakls - "Sanctis")
 HM24 – The Hound (N'to - "The Hound")
 HM25 – Mountain (Joachim Pastor - "Mountain")
 HM26 – North Sea (Stereoclip - "North Sea")
 HM27 – Croche (N'to - "Croche")
 HM28 – Ariane (Joachim Pastor - "Ariane")
 HM29 – Alter Ego (N’to - "Alter Ego")
 HM30 – Corsair (Joachim Pastor - "Corsair")
 HM31 – Charlie (N’to - "Charlie")
 HM32 – Cloches (Worakls - "Cloches")
 HMR3 – Orchestra (Worakls - "Orchestra")
 HM33 – Eiffel Powder (Joachim Pastor - "Eiffel Powder")
 HM34 – The Morning After (N'to - "The Morning After")
 HM35 – Time to Lose (Joris Delacroix - "Time to Lose")
HM36 – Goodbyes (Joachim Pastor - "Goodbyes")
 HM37 - Stay (Joris Delacroix - Stay & Stay (Short Version))

External links 

 Official Website : http://www.hungrymusic.fr
 SoundCloud : http://www.soundcloud.com/hungry-music
 Hungry Music TV : https://www.youtube.com/user/HungryMusicTV
 Spotify Research : Joachim Pastor / Hungry MuSic / 2015/16

References 

Techno record labels
French record labels
French independent record labels
Record labels established in 2014
Aix-en-Provence